Hell's Kitchen is the debut solo studio album by Maxim, a member of the Prodigy. It was released on XL Recordings on 2 October 2000. It features guest appearances from Diamond J, Skin, Divine Styler, Trina Allen, Tony Titanium, Blood of Abraham, and Sneaker Pimps.

Track listing

Personnel
Credits adapted from liner notes.

 Maxim – production (1–11), mixing (1, 4, 6, 7, 9, 11), vocals (2, 3, 7, 8, 10–12), art direction, design
 Ollie J – production (2, 3, 5), mixing (2, 3, 5)
 Diamond J – turntables (2, 7)
 Skin – vocals (3)
 Kieron Pepper – guitar (3)
 Lalo Creme – guitar (3, 8)
 Divine Styler – vocals (4)
 Trina Allen – vocals (6, 8)
 Marianne Morgan – additional vocals (6)
 Jim Davies – guitar (6)
 Liam Howlett – production (6), bass line programming (6), drum programming (6), vocal mixing (10)
 Tony Titanium – vocals (7)
 Jim Abbiss – production (8), mixing (8)
 Emre Ramazanoglu – engineering (8)
 Blood of Abraham – vocals (9)
 Dan Ubick – guitar (9)
 Cyrus Melchor – additional programming (9)
 Chris Corner – vocals (12)
 Sneaker Pimps – guest appearance (12)
 Line of Flight Productions – production (12)
 Mike Marsh – mastering
 Phil Lee – art direction, design
 Hot Glass Design – cover models
 Dominic Davies – cover photography, booklet photography
 Dennis Morris – Maxim photography
 Jim Murray – illustration

Charts

References

External links
 

2000 debut albums
Maxim (musician) albums
XL Recordings albums
Albums produced by Liam Howlett
Albums produced by Jim Abbiss